Franklin Pitcher "Pitch" Johnson (January 2, 1901 – September 21, 1967) was an American track and field athlete who competed in the 1924 Summer Olympics. He was born in St. Louis, Missouri and died in Rubidoux, California.

In 1924 Johnson was selected for the US Olympic Team at the Paris Games in the 110 meter hurdles, and made it through to the semi-finals before being eliminated. 110 metre hurdles competition

Johnson was the track and field coach (1928–40) and director of the Drake Relays (1933–40) at Drake University, and the director of track and field (1941–43) at Stanford University. He served as an athletic instructor there until the end of World War II. After the cessation of hostilities in the Pacific he went to the Philippines and Japan in 1945 for the US Army to organize and conduct the Pacific Army Olympics. He entered private business in Southern California in 1947.

He married Mary Caroline MacDavitt, whom he had met at the University of Illinois, in 1927. They had two children, Franklin Pitcher Johnson Jr., and Martin Lee Johnson, both of whom were track athletes at Stanford.

In 2009, he was selected by the U.S. Track & Field and Cross Country Coaches Association (USTFCCCA) for that organization's hall of fame. The award was given at their annual meeting in Orlando, FL on December 16, 2009. The citation issued by them read:

Drake University established the title of "The Franklin P. Johnson Director of the Drake Relays" on April 22, 2010, in conjunction with the 101st running of the Relays. The first holder of the title, Brian Brown, was the director of the Relays from 2006-16. He was succeeded in 2016 by Blake Boldon, the 12th director of the Drake Relays since its founding in 1912.

References

External links
 
 
 USTFCCCA Hall of Fame Class of 2009 Announcement

1901 births
1967 deaths
American male hurdlers
Olympic track and field athletes of the United States
Athletes (track and field) at the 1924 Summer Olympics
Track and field athletes from St. Louis
People from Riverside County, California